Bojo, Bo Jo, or variants, may refer to:

People
 Bojo Jinul (1158–1210), 12th century Korean monk
 Bojo Molina (born 1973), Filipino actor
 Boris Johnson (born 1964), sometimes nicknamed BoJo, prime minister of the United Kingdom (2019–2022)
 Fujiwara no Morosuke (909–960), known as Minister of the Right Bojo (Bōjō-udaijin), Japanese statesman
 Wakamatsu Shizuko (1864–1896; nom-de-plume "Bojo"), Japanese novelist

Surnamed Bojo
 Bojo Nobuko (坊城伸子; 1830–1850), concubine-wife of Emperor Kōmei of Japan
 Major Bojo, a Japanese commander during the Hsinchu Campaign
 Petar Bojo (born 1998), Croatian soccer player

Fictional characters
 Bojo, a character from Stitch!; see List of Stitch! episodes
 Boswell Johnson "Bo Jo" Jones, titular character from the 1967 novel Mr and Mrs Bo Jo Jones and its 1971 film adaptation
 Rodney 'Bo-Jo' Brown, a character from the 1941 film H. M. Pulham, Esq.

Places
 Bijo, Azerbaijan, also spelled as "Bojo"
 Bojo, one of the Batu Islands of Indonesia
 Bōjō Station, a railway station in Nara Prefecture, Japan
 Bojo (barangay), a village in Aloguinsan in the Philippines
 Bojo River, a river in Aloguinsan in the Philippines

Other uses
 Bojo (band), a Philippine rock band
 "Bojo" (song), a song by Pink Lady; see Live in Budoukan
 "Bojo" (episode), a 2008 season 1 TV episode of Stitch!; see List of Stitch! episodes
 Bojo, a fictional slang term in the 1989 film Back to the Future Part II
 Bojangles', abbreviated Bojo, an affectionate term of endearment for the fast-food restaurant serving fried chicken and biscuits

See also

 Boggio, a surname (see )
 Bo (disambiguation)
 Jo (disambiguation)